Nuclear autoantigenic sperm protein is a protein that in humans is encoded by the NASP gene. Multiple isoforms are encoded by transcript variants of this gene.

Function 

This gene encodes a histone H1 binding protein that is involved in transporting histones into the nucleus of dividing cells.  The somatic form is expressed in all mitotic cells, is localized to the nucleus, and is coupled to the cell cycle. The testicular form is expressed in embryonic tissues, tumor cells, and the testis. In male germ cells, this protein is localized to the cytoplasm of primary spermatocytes, the nucleus of spermatids, and the periacrosomal region of mature spermatozoa.

References

Further reading

Human proteins